Avaloq is a Swiss company that develops and provides software for core banking. The software system, Avaloq Banking Suite, is used by more than 140 banks worldwide.

Background
Core banking includes information about customers, transactions and account balances. Banks have traditionally bought in software for these purposes rather than developing it internally. More functions had to be added over the years as requirements changed, such as for online banking. The result has been very complex computer programs that can be difficult to manage. Coding changes for compliance to new regulations and for accommodating new products can be problematic.

As a result, banks have tended to buy in modern comprehensive software from large, specialist firms. This may be run by the bank itself or by an agency running the computing service on behalf of the bank.

Company history
In 1991, 30% of the share capital was taken by the employees as a result of a partial management buyout. At that time, there were five staff members and the cost of the buyout was $200,000.

The first customer was Swiss National Bank, followed by five other commercial banks in Switzerland. The system then spread worldwide although it has had little impact in America. Initially, the firm was called BZ Informatik, and its product “AdvAntAge”.

In 1996, the current name was adopted. In 2001, the company split from BZ Bank, as the employees acquired 100% of the share capital.

In November 2019, Reuters reported that Warburg Pincus was working with Goldman Sachs and Barclays on a planned IPO or sale of Avaloq.

In October 2020, Avaloq was acquired by NEC Corporation for $2.2bn.

Current activities

Avaloq Banking Group AG employs 2,500 staff, 500 of which are programmers. It has annual revenues of over $500 million and its software accounts for bank deposits to the sum of $4 trillion. The founder is Francisco Fernandez.

The Avaloq Banking Suite software is used by over 450 customers including HSBC, Barclays, Royal Bank of Scotland, UBS, Deutsche Bank, Nomura and Societe Generale. Some of the customers have performed business process outsourcing to Avaloq itself for the actual running of the core computing service, which uses cloud computing. Apart from a 10% holding by a Swiss bank, Avaloq is owned by its employees, and it has major offices in Zurich, Edinburgh and Manila. In 2016, the firm was rumoured to be seeking investment from private equity investors.

The security of the data stored by the system is of the utmost importance. To guard against cyber attack, the firm engages a number of companies based in Israel to attempt to break through the security systems and then help plug the weaknesses uncovered.

References

Software companies of Switzerland
Banking software companies
Financial services companies established in 1985
Software companies established in 1985
Swiss companies established in 1985
Business software companies
Companies based in Zürich
Financial services companies of Switzerland
Financial technology companies
Swiss brands
2020 mergers and acquisitions
NEC subsidiaries
NEC acquisitions